Axinella damicornis, known as yellow sponge and crumpled duster sponge, is a marine sponge in the family Axinellidae, first described by Eugenius Johann Christoph Esper in 1794 as Spongia damicornis.

References

Axinellidae
Taxa named by Eugenius Johann Christoph Esper